Robert F. Zamuner (born September 17, 1969) is a Canadian former professional ice hockey forward, who played thirteen seasons in the NHL, most notably with the Tampa Bay Lightning.

Playing career
Zamuner played junior hockey for the Guelph Platers of the Ontario Hockey League and was drafted 45th overall by the New York Rangers in the 1987 NHL Entry Draft. He played only briefly for New York, spending more time on their AHL affiliate in Binghamton.

In 1992 he signed as a free agent with the expansion Tampa Bay Lightning when the Rangers showed little interest in re-signing him. In Tampa he developed a reputation as a competent, hard working, defensive-minded forward, and was named team captain in 1998. The next year he was traded to the Ottawa Senators for Andreas Johansson and the right to sign General Manager Rick Dudley, who was still serving as GM of the Senators. He played in Ottawa for two seasons, playing regularly on the third line in a defensive role. In 2001, he moved on, signing as a free agent with the Boston Bruins.

During the 2004–05 NHL lockout, Zamuner went to play with HC Basel in Switzerland. With his scoring deteriorating, no NHL team was willing to sign him so he stayed in Europe the next season, signing with Bolzano HC in Italy.  On June 6, 2006, Zamuner signed to play the remainder of the 2006 season with the Brisbane Blue Tongues of the Australian Ice Hockey League, after which he retired.

Internationally, Zamuner played twice on Canada's world championship teams. Zamuner's defensive play, along with his exceptional face-off taking ability led to a surprise selection on Canada's 1998 Olympic men's hockey team.

Personal life
Zamuner and his wife, Ann have three children and the family resides in Oakville, Ontario.

Zamuner is currently employed with the NHLPA as their Atlantic Divisional Representative.

Career statistics

Regular season and playoffs

International

See also
Captain (ice hockey)

References

External links

1969 births
Living people
EHC Basel players
Binghamton Rangers players
Bolzano HC players
Boston Bruins players
Brisbane Blue Tongues players
Canadian expatriate ice hockey players in Australia
Canadian ice hockey left wingers
Flint Spirits players
Guelph Platers players
Sportspeople from Oakville, Ontario
Ice hockey players at the 1998 Winter Olympics
New York Rangers draft picks
New York Rangers players
Olympic ice hockey players of Canada
Ottawa Senators players
Providence Bruins players
Tampa Bay Lightning players
Ice hockey people from Ontario
Canadian expatriate ice hockey players in Italy
Canadian expatriate ice hockey players in Switzerland
Canadian expatriate ice hockey players in the United States